Ștefan Iulius Gavril (born 17 July 1989 in Brașov) is a Romanian distance runner who competes over distances from 800 metres to the half marathon.

Gavril was a Romanian national record holder in two events: the 5K run and 10K run road race.

He is an athlete of  Nice Côte d'Azur Athletisme.

Biography
In 2003, he moved with his family to Italy and start  with kickboxing and martial arts. In 2011, he won the BestFighter World Cup (KickBoxing) but in the following years he found a passion for running. In 2013, he ran his first competition in Turin. After 6 months he moved again, to Umeå, and began training consistently. He studied Political Science and International Relationships at Umeå University while there. He was a member of IFK Umeå between 2013 and 2014.

Afterwards, he moved to run for Nice Côte d'Azur Athletisme. From 2016 and on he made an improvement every performance, peaking in December 2019, where he run the new Romanian national record for the 10K run. He followed that feat in February 2020 with another national record; racing in Monaco he recorded an official time of 14:06 for the 5K run.

He represented his country at the 2020 Balkan Half Marathon Championships in Zagreb. In this competition, he finished in fourth place with a new personal best.

In 2022, Stefan has been selected for the European Cross Country Championships in Turin.

He won many events around Europe in those events including a top ten finish in the Valencia 10K. He duplicated the feat at the Monaco 5K, an extremely fast competition where the winner established the new world record. He is the winner of 2019 Fort-de-France Half Marathon.

Personal bests
 1000 metres – 2:30.14 (Monaco 2019)
 1500 metres – 3:52.09 (Pitești 2017)
 1500 metres indoor – 3:59.96 (Bucharest 2019)
 3000 metres – 8:17.39 (Milan 2018)
 3000 metres indoor – 8:16.49 (Valencia 2020)
 5000 metres – 14:05.88 (Milan 2021)
 10,000 metres – 29:33.44 (London 2019)
Road
 5 kilometres – 14:07 (Monaco 2020)
 10 kilometres – 28:53 (Dakhla 2019)
Source:

International competitions

References

Stéphane Julius Gavril (Roumanie) vainqueur du 35e semi-marathon de Fort-de-France

VINOVO - Hipporun fa registrare un successo senza precedenti: 1300 atleti in gara fra Vinovo e Stupinigi - I VINCITORI
Portofino Run: Stefan Gavril e Mina El Kanoussi vincono un'ottava edizione da record - Genova 24
Vegelj e Gavril nell’albo d’oro: ecco i vincitori della Stratorino edizione 2017
Appuntamento di prestigio con la Mezza Maratona di Trino
Atleti di altissimo livello alla mezza maratona “Terre d’Acqua” | VercelliNotizie
Les Métropolitaines. Stefan Gavril solide vainqueur, retrouvez tous les résultats. Sport
Results: Herculis Monaco Run 2020 | Watch Athletics
FANIEL-DANDOLO: STRAVICENZA DA RECORD – MARATONINA DELLA VITTORIA: TRIONFO KENYA – Fidal Veneto

External links

 
 Site officiel

1989 births
Living people
Sportspeople from Brașov
Romanian middle-distance runners
Romanian long-distance runners